Victor Guillermo Ramos Rangel (February 10, 1911, Cúa, Miranda state, Venezuela – December 10, 1986, Caracas) was a Venezuelan classical musician.

Started his career in the Caracas Musical Declamation Academy (nowadays renamed in honor to José Ángel Lamas), where he graduated as composer. Ramos was one of the first students of Vicente Emilio Sojo and helped him in the compilation of Venezuelan folk songs.

In 1930, he is part of the founders of the Venezuela Symphony Orchestra and the Orfeón Lamas. In this orchestra dedicated to execute the Bassoon.

From 1941 to 1950, he was professor in Caracas' public schools such as: 19 de abril, Rubén González, Ricardo Zuloaga and Gabriela Mistral."

In 1945, Ramos worked for the Education Ministry and was a music professor in the Cultural Direction of Caracas. In 1947 he married Dilia Díaz Cisneros, with whom he had a daughter and two sons. From 1944 until 1978, he was Professor of Theory, Solfege and Music History at the José Ángel Lamas Superior Music School. In 1978, he participated in the documentary about his hometown, for the series  (Towns of Venezuela), of filmmaker Carlos Oteyza.

Along with the Symphony Orchestra of Venezuela he traveled to Europe and the United States. Also, was member of the National Geographic Society reading club. In his live, he traveled around the world for cultural interests and the learning of new languages. Among his compositions, can be mentioned: Lo Eterno, La maravilla (Aprended flores de mi), A José María España, Bambú de caña batiente; and the songs Gota de agua and Amanecer.

 See also 
Orfeón Lamas
Venezuela Symphony Orchestra

 References Sociedad Orquesta Sinfónica Venezuela 1930-1955. Caracas: Cromotip, 1955.Diccionario de la Música en Venezuela. Caracas: Bigott Foundation, 1998. Música y músicos de Venezuela''. Ernesto Magliano. Caracas: Corporación Venezolana de Guayana, 1976. 
 Efemérides: 10 de diciembre de 1986/Muere Víctor Guillermo Ramos Rangel - Encontrarte

1911 births
1986 deaths
People from Cúa
Venezuelan classical bassoonists
Venezuelan classical musicians
Venezuelan composers
Male composers
20th-century classical musicians
20th-century composers
20th-century male musicians